Ricky Chilnady Pratama Harun better known as Ricky Harun (born 12 January 1987) is an Indonesian actor. He is the eldest son of Donna Harun and Ardy Gustav.

Career 
Harun has been familiar since childhood with the world of entertainment, as his mother is a senior model. At first, he did not want to plunge into the same world, but was apparently hooked after given the chance to have a role in an Indonesian soap opera, Pinokio dan Peri Biru (2005). Afterwards he starred in several soap operas, including Sherina with Eva Celia Latjuba, and Penjaga Hati.

This horror movie starred Arswendy Nasution, Chintami Atmanegara, Titi Qadarsih, Ruhut Sitompul, Asya Shara, and new entrants Amelia and Ricky Harun. In 2007, Ricky appeared again in a horror film, this time directed by Jose Purnomo, and titled Pulau Hantu.

Personal life 
Harun had an affair with sitcom actress and BBB personnel Chelsea Olivia. Their relationship did not last long, and the two ended it well. Although reportedly close to Eva Celia Latjuba, daughter of Sophia Latjuba, but Ricky finally tether her on Sheila Marcia. Their relationship did not last long, and finally broke.

Filmography

Films

FTV 
 Mak Comblang Jatuh Cinta (with Yuniza Icha and Nikita Willy)
 Sorry I Love You (with Dhea Lestari)
 17 Hari Mencari Cinta
 Yang Muda Bercinta (with Yuniza Icha)
 Cinta Aku Dan Mama (with Yuniza Icha and Samuel Zylgwyn)
 Ratu Cinta Kilat (with Nikita Willy)
 Bukan Buaya Darat
 Pacar yang Lupa Punya Pacar (with Nikita Willy)
 Pacar Gue Buaya Darat (with Nikita Willy, Seikha Wedya, Riskyna Wulan and Aji Yusman)
 Playboy Kantoran (with Ayu Hastari)

Televisioon 
 Inikah Rasanya
 Pinokio & Peri Biru (first indonovela aired in the Philippines)
 Penjaga Hati
 Sherina
 Rindu Milik Rangga
 Hitam Putih
 Timur Cinta
 Dia atau Diriku
 Si Biang Kerok
 Si Biang Kerok Cilik
 ABG Jadi Manten
 Emak Ijah Pengen Ke Mekah
 Ganteng Ganteng Serigala
 Pangeran
 Julaiha Princess Betawi
 Cinta Dari Surga
 Insya Allah Syurga

Music video
 Hafizah by (Sembilan Band)
 Ku Tetap Menanti by (Nikita Willy)

References

External links 
 

1987 births
Indonesian male film actors
Living people